Dong Bai (董白, b. after 178) was a Chinese noblewoman member of the Dong family during the late Eastern Han dynasty. She was the granddaughter of Dong Zhuo, a warlord and de facto ruler of China during a short period. She received grand titles and lands after Dong Zhuo took control of the Han Imperial court; titling Bai as ''Lady of Weiyang'' at the age of 15.

Life 
There are no records about Dong Bai's date of birth and her parents are unknown. She was the granddaughter of Dong Zhuo, a warlord who took control of the imperial capital Luoyang in 189, becoming the de facto ruler of China. Dong Zhuo deposed Emperor Shao and replaced him with the Emperor Xian of Han; declaring himself chancellor. Dong Zhuo's corruption and tyrannical ways led Yuan Shao to form an army in opposition to Dong Zhuo's military authority.

Dong Zhuo distributed titles and lands to the entire family in an attempt to maintain his position. The entire Dong clan received some sort of rank. Dong Bai was given her passage to adulthood ceremony and a grand title and lands at an unceremoniously young age despite a 50-year-old Zhu Jun's protests (a rival of Dong Zhuo who fiercely opposed him). For the grand ceremony, a platform was built to be five to six che –about 116 cm (3'10") or 139 cm (4'7") in modern conversions– and Dong Bai rode in a blue-covered golden carriage as thousands of soldiers marched behind her. Dong Huang, elder brother of Dong Zhuo, was said to have given her the seal personally.

Dong Zhuo fled the Anti-Dong Zhuo Coalition and moved the capital to Chang'an along with the emperor, the emperor's subjects and Luoyang's residents, Zhu Jun remained in Luoyang and maintained contact with the anti-Dong Zhuo coalition. However, he feared that Dong Zhuo would turn back and attack him, so he abandoned his post and fled south to Jing Province.   

In 192, with the encouragement of Minister of the Interior Wang Yun, Lü Bu (Dong Zhuo's adopted son) assassinated Dong Zhuo. After Dong Zhuo's death, all members of the Dong clan, including his 90-year-old mother, were executed. It is unknown if Dong Bai was executed along with her other family members.

References

External sources 

 Chen, Shou (3rd century). Records of the Three Kingdoms (Sanguozhi).
 
 Fan, Ye (5th century). Book of the Later Han (Houhanshu).

2nd-century Chinese women
2nd-century Chinese people
Dong_Zhuo_and_associates